Pak Nam Krasae is a tambon (sub-district) of Klaeng District, Rayong Province in eastern Thailand.

History
"Pak Nam Krasae", also known as "Pak Nam Prasae", literally means "estuary of Krasae (Prasae) River", according to the nature of its terrain. It is a community is an ancient community since the Ayutthaya period, not less than 200 years old. 

Its name is assumed to be from Chong language Sae (แซรฺ), which means 'rice field'.

Pak Nam Krasae is a riverside community, The community is rich with natural resources and diverse in cultures. The population lives in the community are Thai and Thai Chinese. Pak Nam Krasae community area has both the waterfront and not next to the waterfront.

Geography
Pak Nam Krasae has an area of 3,037.50 rais (4.866 square kilometers).

The contact territories are as follows (from north clockwise): Khlong Pun, Phang Rat, Prasae River (empties into the Gulf of Thailand), and Neun Kho.

Prasae (Krasae) River is a main watercourse of the area.

Pak Nam Krasae is also rich in mangrove forests.

Administration
The area is governed by the Subdistrict-Municipality Pak Nam Prasae (เทศบาลตำบลปากน้ำประแส).

Economy
Almost half of the population who live along the waterfront are fishing. While the people who settled in the area and are not adjacent to the waterfront, work as rice farmers and orchard cultivators. The tourism industry is another important source of income for the local.

Places
Tung Prongthong (mangrove forest)
HTMS Prasae (PF 2) Memorial
Wat Sommuttithep Thapanaram Temple
Laem Son Beach
Prasae Sin Bridge
Wat Takian Ngam Temple and Ancient Takian Tree
Prince Abhakara Kiartivongse Shrine

Local traditions
Water Kathina (corresponds to Loy Krathong)
Make Merit In The Boat

References

Tourist attractions in Rayong province
Tambon of Rayong province